The 2020 South Carolina State Senate elections took place as part of the biennial 2020 United States elections. South Carolina voters elected state senators in all of the state's 46 senate districts. State senators serve four-year terms in the South Carolina Senate, with all of the seats up for election each cycle. The primary elections on June 9, 2020, determined which candidates appeared on the November 3, 2020, general election ballot.

Following the previous election in 2016, Republicans had control of the South Carolina Senate with 27 seats to Democrats' 19 seats.

Results

Summary

Outgoing incumbents

Retiring
Three incumbent senators are not seeking re-election in 2020, leaving three open seats.
Greg Gregory (R–Lancaster), representing District 16 from 1992–2008 and then since 2011. He announced that he would not be seeking re-election on October 23, 2019.
John W. Matthews Jr. (D–Orangeburg), representing District 39 since 1984. He had previously served in the South Carolina House of Representatives from 1975–1984. He announced that he would not be seeking re-election on March 10, 2020.
Paul G. Campbell Jr. (R–Berkeley), representing District 44 since 2007. He announced that he would not be seeking re-election on March 23, 2020.

Defeated
No incumbents were defeated in their primaries. Luke A. Rankin (R–Horry), who has represented District 33 since 1992, was the only incumbent whose primary was forced to go to a runoff, after he failed to obtain 50% of the vote in his primary. The runoff took place on June 23, 2020, between Rankin and challenger John Gallman, and was won by Rankin.

Predictions

Detailed results

District 1
Incumbent Thomas C. Alexander ran unopposed in the Republican primary and the general election.

District 2
Incumbent Rex Rice ran unopposed in the Republican primary and the general election.

District 3
Incumbent Richard Cash faced opposition in the Republican primary. Judith Polson ran unopposed in the Democratic primary.

District 4
Incumbent Michael Gambrell ran unopposed in the Republican primary. Jose Villa ran unopposed in the Democratic primary.

District 5
Incumbent Tom Corbin faced opposition in the Republican primary. Michael McCord ran unopposed in the Democratic primary.

District 6
Incumbent Dwight Loftis ran unopposed in the Republican primary. Hao Wu ran unopposed in the Democratic primary.

District 7
Incumbent Karl B. Allen faced opposition in the Democratic primary. Jack Logan ran unopposed in the Republican primary.

District 8
Incumbent Ross Turner faced opposition in the Republican primary, but ran unopposed in the general election.

District 9
Incumbent Danny Verdin ran unopposed in the Republican primary and the general election.

District 10
Incumbent Floyd Nicholson ran unopposed in the Democratic primary. Two candidates ran in the Republican primary.

District 11
Incumbent Glenn Reese ran unopposed in the Democratic primary. Josh Kimbrell ran unopposed in the Republican primary.

District 12
Incumbent Scott Talley faced opposition in the Republican primary. Dawn Bingham ran unopposed in the Democratic primary.

District 13
Incumbent Shane Martin ran unopposed in the Republican primary and the general election.

District 14
Incumbent Harvey S. Peeler Jr. ran unopposed in the Republican primary, but faced opposition from a third-party candidate in the general election.

District 15
Incumbent Wes Climer ran unopposed in the Republican primary. Vickie Holt ran unopposed in the Democratic primary.

District 16
This seat was one of three open seats in this election cycle. Four candidates ran in the Republican primary, with two advancing to a runoff. Ramin Mammadov ran unopposed in the Democratic primary.

District 17
Incumbent Mike Fanning faced opposition in the Democratic primary. Erin Mosley ran unopposed in the Republican primary.

District 18
Incumbent Ronnie Cromer faced opposition in the Republican primary. Christopher Thibault ran unopposed in the Democratic primary.

District 19
Incumbent John L. Scott Jr. ran unopposed in the Democratic primary and the general election.

District 20
Incumbent Dick Harpootlian ran unopposed in the Democratic primary. Two candidates ran in the Republican primary.

District 21
Incumbent Darrell Jackson ran unopposed in the Democratic primary and the general election.

District 22
Incumbent Mia McLeod ran unopposed in the Democratic primary. Two candidates ran in the Republican primary.

District 23
Incumbent Katrina Shealy ran unopposed in the Republican primary. Bill Brown ran unopposed in the Democratic primary.

District 24
Incumbent Tom Young Jr. ran unopposed in the Republican primary. Lisa Williams was set to run unopposed in the Democratic primary, but withdrew before it took place.

District 25
Incumbent A. Shane Massey faced opposition in the Republican primary. Shirley Green Fayson ran unopposed in the Democratic primary.

District 26
Incumbent Nikki G. Setzler ran unopposed in the Democratic primary. Two candidates ran in the Republican primary.

District 27
Incumbent Vincent Sheheen ran unopposed in the Democratic primary. Penry Gustafson ran unopposed in the Republican primary.

District 28
Incumbent Greg Hembree ran unopposed in the Republican primary and the general election.

District 29
Incumbent Gerald Malloy ran unopposed in the Democratic primary. Two candidates ran in the Republican primary.

District 30
Incumbent Kent M. Williams faced opposition in the Democratic primary, but ran unopposed in the general election.

District 31
Incumbent Hugh Leatherman ran unopposed in the Republican primary and the general election.

District 32
Incumbent Ronnie A. Sabb faced opposition in the Democratic primary. David Ellison ran unopposed in the Republican primary.

District 33
Incumbent Luke A. Rankin faced opposition in the Republican primary, but ran unopposed in the general election.

District 34
Incumbent Stephen Goldfinch ran unopposed in the Republican primary. Emily Cegledy ran unopposed in the Democratic primary.

District 35
Incumbent Thomas McElveen ran unopposed in the Democratic primary and the general election.

District 36
Incumbent Kevin L. Johnson faced opposition in the Democratic primary. Leon Winn ran unopposed in the Republican primary.

District 37
Incumbent Larry Grooms ran unopposed in the Republican primary. Kathryn Whitaker ran unopposed in the Democratic primary. A third-party candidate also contested the general election.

District 38
Incumbent Sean Bennett ran unopposed in the Republican primary. John Lowe ran unopposed in the Democratic primary.

District 39
This seat was one of three open seats in this election cycle. Four candidates ran in the Democratic primary, with two advancing to a runoff. Tom Connor ran unopposed in the Republican primary.

District 40
Incumbent Brad Hutto faced opposition in the Democratic primary, but ran unopposed in the general election.

District 41
Incumbent Sandy Senn faced no opposition in the Republican primary. Two candidates ran in the Democratic primary.

District 42
Incumbent Marlon Kimpson ran unopposed in the Democratic primary and the general election.

District 43
Incumbent Chip Campsen ran unopposed in the Republican primary. Richard Hricik ran unopposed in the Democratic primary.

District 44
This seat was one of three open seats in this election cycle. Two candidates ran in the Democratic primary, and two candidates ran in the Republican primary.

District 45
Incumbent Margie Bright Matthews ran unopposed in the Democratic primary. Rodney Buncum ran unopposed in the Republican primary.

District 46
Incumbent Tom Davis ran unopposed in the Republican primary. Nathan Campbell ran unopposed in the Democratic primary.

Margins of victory

Primaries

Primary Runoffs

General Elections

See also
 2020 South Carolina elections
 2020 United States elections
 2020 South Carolina Democratic presidential primary
 2020 United States Senate election in South Carolina
 2020 United States House of Representatives elections in South Carolina
 South Carolina Senate

References

External links
 
 
  (State affiliate of the U.S. League of Women Voters)
 

Senate
South Carolina Senate elections
South Carolina State Senate